Kim Nam-hoon (born 8 March 1970) is a South Korean former professional tennis player.

Kim, a graduate of Yeungnam High School in Daegu, attended Ulsan University and was a men's doubles gold medalist for South Korea at the 1993 Summer Universiade in Buffalo.

On the professional tour, Kim was a three-time doubles main draw entrant on the ATP Tour's Korea Open and a singles quarter-finalist at a Seoul Challenger tournament in 1994, beating the top-seeded Tim Henman en route.

Kim was a member of the South Korea Davis Cup team in 1998 and secured a tie against China with a win in doubles, partnering Kim Dong-hyun. He also captained the side after being appointed men's national coach in 2008.

See also
List of South Korea Davis Cup team representatives

References

External links
 
 
 

1970 births
Living people
South Korean male tennis players
Sportspeople from Daegu
University of Ulsan alumni
Medalists at the 1993 Summer Universiade
Universiade gold medalists for South Korea
Universiade medalists in tennis
20th-century South Korean people